The 2018–20 World Boxing Super Series – cruiserweight division was a World Boxing Super Series professional boxing tournament which took place between October 2018 and September 2020 in several countries. The Super Series features eight top-rated cruiserweight boxers in a single-elimination tournament. The tournament was organized by Comosa AG.

This tournament will be the second World Boxing Super Series held at cruiserweight, following the 2017–18 edition, which saw Oleksandr Usyk unify all four major world titles.

Participants

Brackets 
Source:

Quarter-finals 
The quarterfinals are held from 13 October to 10 November 2018.

Semi-finals 
Both semifinal fights were held on 15 June 2019, at Arēna Rīga, Riga, Latvia.

Final 
The final originally was to be held on 16 May 2020 at Arēna Rīga, Riga, Latvia, the same place as the semi-finals, for the IBF and The Ring titles, but was postponed to 26 September 2020 at Plazamedia Broadasting Center, Munich, Germany due to the COVID-19 pandemic and will be played behind closed doors.

References 

World Boxing Super Series
World Boxing Super Series
World Boxing Super Series
World Boxing Super Series